The Joke's on You is the second album by Excel, released in 1989. The song "The Joke's on You" was already released on the previous album, Split Image. This album saw something of a departure from the hardcore punk influences of its predecessor, boasting a more traditional thrash metal sound, akin to that of Anthrax and Bay Area bands like Exodus, Testament, Forbidden or Vio-lence. The album also features doom metal influences, as well as some of the earliest examples of groove metal.

Although The Joke's on You never reached any major charts, it is often considered Excel's best release, and it features their live staples "Fired (You're)", "Tapping into the Emotional Void", "Seeing Insane" and "My Thoughts". "Tapping into the Emotional Void" gained considerable attention years after its release, due to accusations that Metallica had plagiarized the opening riff to that song on their 1991 song "Enter Sandman", which had also resulted in Excel taking legal action.

The Joke's on You is also the last Excel album recorded with the "classic" line-up members Adam Siegel (guitar) and Greg Saenz (drums). Following their departure, Excel's music would take a different direction on their next album, 1995's Seeking Refuge.

Availability
Two different covers of The Joke's on You exist: the original version featured a white cover and the 2001 re-release featured a black cover. Like many Excel albums, the recording is out of print, but this album, along with the band's others, can readily be found for sale on Chinese, Ukrainian, and Russian mp3 websites.

Album Track listing(s)
All songs by Excel, except "Message in a Bottle", originally by The Police.

Original release

Side one
 "Drive" (2:27)
 "Shadow Winds" (4:17)
 "Fired (You're)" (3:16)
 "Tapping into the Emotional Void" (4:20)
 "Affection Blends with Resentment" (3:56)
 "Seeing Insane" (3:18)

Side two
 "My Thoughts" (3:19)
 "I Never Denied" (5:19)
 "Message in a Bottle" (2:51)
 "Given Question" (3:53)
 "The Stranger" (2:53)

CD version
 "Drive" (2:27)
 "Shadow Winds" (4:17)
 "Fired (You're)" (3:16)
 "Tapping into the Emotional Void" (4:20)
 "Affection Blends with Resentment" (3:56)
 "Seeing Insane" (3:18)
 "My Thoughts" (3:19)
 "I Never Denied" (5:19)
 "Message in a Bottle" (2:51)
 "Given Question" (3:53)
 "The Stranger" (2:53)
 "Blaze Some Hate" (3:24)

Track notes: The last track, "Blaze Some Hate", appears only on the original CD version as a bonus track.

2001 re-issue
 "Drive" (2:27)
 "Shadow Winds" (4:17)
 "Fired (You're)" (3:16)
 "Tapping into the Emotional Void" (4:20)
 "Affection Blends with Resentment" (3:56)
 "Seeing Insane" (3:18)
 "My Thoughts" (3:19)
 "I Never Denied" (5:19)
 "Message in a Bottle" (2:51)
 "Given Question" (3:53)
 "The Stranger" (2:53)
 "Blaze Some Hate" (3:24)
 "Cultured" (4:42)
 "More Than You'd Ever Know" (3:49)
 "Soul Sick" (3:46)
 "Withdrawal" (3:58)
 "Priorities Astray" (3:42)

Track notes: The last five unreleased tracks are demo tracks of later material. They were originally recorded in 1991 while Excel was planning their follow-up to this album.

Personnel
 Dan Clements – lead vocals
 Adam Siegel – guitars, backing vocals
 Shaun Ross – bass guitar, backing vocals
 Greg Saenz – drums, backing vocals

References

Excel (band) albums
1989 albums
Caroline Records albums